Antonio Vico may refer to:

Antonio Vico (cardinal) (1847–1929), cardinal of the Catholic Church
Antonio Vico y Pintos (1840–1940), Spanish stage actor